The Oker–Bad Harzburg railway is a branch line between Oker and Bad Harzburg on the northern edge of the Harz mountains in Germany. It was opened on May 1, 1912.

Route 
The 6.9 kilometre long route is single-tracked between Oker and Bad Harzburg.

Operations 
The line is worked by regional trains on the Kreiensen–Seesen–Goslar–Bad Harzburg and Hanover–Hildesheim–Goslar–Bad Harzburg route.

References

Oker-Bad Harzburg
Transport in the Harz
Railway lines opened in 1912
1912 establishments in Germany
Buildings and structures in Goslar (district)